The Atlantic City Seagulls were a professional basketball team based in Atlantic City, New Jersey. They played 6 seasons in the United States Basketball League (USBL), winning 3 consecutive league titles between 1997 and 1999.

History
The franchise was founded in early 1996 by a group of investors led by Philadelphia native Paul Lipschutz. The first coach was Mike Gatley. In their inaugural season, the team won the Northern Division title with a 22–7 record and reached the league finals, after defeating Connecticut Skyhawks in the quarterfinals and the Tampa Bay Windjammers in the semifinals; the Seagulls lost to the Florida Sharks in the USBL finals, 115–118. Former McDonald's All-American and Syracuse guard Michael Lloyd won the USBL Rookie of the Year award, and three players were named to all-league teams (Greg Grant to the All-USBL First Team and Mark Strickland and Ron Anderson to the Second Team).

In April 1997 the Seagulls signed R&B singer R. Kelly to a professional basketball contract. The team ended the regular season with the best record in the league (20–6, .769), won their second division title in a row, and again reached the USBL finals, defeating the Philadelphia Power in the quarterfinals and the Raleigh Cougars in the semifinals. Facing the Long Island Surf in the USBL finals, the Seagulls won the game, 114–112, and obtained their first USBL title. The team could count on the league's top rebounder, Brent Scott, and the season assists leader Mark Baker: Scott and Baker were named Postseason co-MVPs, while coach Kevin Mackey received the Coach of the Year award.

In 1998 the Seagulls were moved to the newly created Mid-Atlantic Division: they finished the season with an 18–8 record (second in the league behind the Long Island Surf's 18–7) and qualified for the playoffs for the third consecutive season. In the second round the team defeated the Atlanta Trojans, 118–107, and in the Final Four they beat the Jacksonville Barracudas, 122–107. For the second season in a row, the Seagulls beat the Long Island Surf in the league finals (100–96) and won the USBL title. Adrian Griffin won the Postseason MVP award.

In 1999 the team won the Mid-Atlantic Division title again with a 23–6 record, the best in the league and also the best in franchise history (.793). They reached the finals after defeating the Tampa Bay Windjammers in the quarterfinals and the Pennsylvania Valleydawgs in the semifinals; in the USBL finals they beat the Connecticut Skyhawks, 83–77, and obtained their third consecutive championship. Adrian Griffin won both the Player of the Year and the Postseason MVP awards, while Kevin Mackey was named the league's Coach of the Year and Lloyd led the league in scoring at 27.3 points per game.

In 2000, the Seagulls' performance dropped: they was assigned to the Northern Division, and they ended with a 12–18 record, the first losing record in their history, and barely qualified for the postseason, where they lost to the Dodge City Legend, 107–122. In 2001 the team lost all 28 games and had the worst record in the history of league, finishing at the last spot of the Northern Division: on that same year, the team was disbanded. In their last season, the Seagulls had averaged less than 100 fans in attendance.

Season-by-season records

Source:

Awards
USBL Player of the Year: Adrian Griffin (1999)
USBL Postseason MVP: Mark Baker & Brent Scott (1997), Adrian Griffin (2×, 1998–1999)
USBL Rookie of the Year: Michael Lloyd (1996)
USBL Coach of the Year: Kevin Mackey (2×, 1997 and 1999)

Notable players

 Mark Baker
 Mark Blount
 William Cunningham
 Paul Graham
 Greg Grant
 Evric Gray
 LaMarr Greer
 Adrian Griffin
 Chris Jent
 Eric Johnson
 Garth Joseph
 R. Kelly
 Marijan Kraljević
 Michael Lloyd
 Mark Macon
 Brent Scott

 Charles Smith
 Mark Strickland
 Carl Thomas
 Charles Thomas
 Marko Tušek
 K'zell Wesson

Source

References

Defunct basketball teams in the United States
Defunct sports teams in New Jersey
Basketball teams in New Jersey
1996 establishments in New Jersey
Sports in New Jersey
Basketball teams established in 1996
2001 disestablishments in New Jersey
Sports clubs disestablished in 1996
Sports clubs disestablished in 2001
United States Basketball League teams